True Eames Boardman (born William True Boardman Jr., October 25, 1909 – July 28, 2003) was an American actor and scriptwriter.

Born in Seattle, Washington, Boardman was the only child of actress Virginia Eames and action-adventure star True Boardman.

Boardman's education included a bachelor's degree in English literature from UCLA and a master's degree in theater from Occidental College.

He began acting in 1912 and had acted in six films by the age of 10.

Boardman was a writer for Silver Theater, a dramatic anthology series on CBS radio in the 1930s and 1940s. On May 21 and May 28, 1939, he also appeared as an actor on the program, starring with Helen Hayes in "Crossroads for Two," a two-part drama.

During World War II, Boardman was an Army captain whose duties included creating radio programming for American troops via the Armed Forces Radio Service.

Family
He is the grandfather of Lisa Gerritsen.

Death 
On July 28, 2003, Boardman died in Pebble Beach, California, aged 94.

Selected filmography

As a writer
 Pardon My Sarong (1942)
 Arabian Nights (1942)
 The Painted Hills (1951)

As an actor
 Broncho Billy's Heart (1912)
 The Reward for Broncho Billy (1912)
 Broncho Billy Reforms (1913)
 Snakeville's Fire Brigade (1914)
 The Conquest of Man (1914)
 Sophie's Birthday Party (1914)
 The Hazards of Helen (1914)
 Shoulder Arms (1918) (in unused scenes)
 The Flirt (1922)
 Dan August

References

Bibliography
 Holmstrom, John. The Moving Picture Boy: An International Encyclopaedia from 1895 to 1995, Norwich, Michael Russell, 1996, pp. 40 – 41.

External links

American male silent film actors
American male screenwriters
20th-century American male actors
1909 births
2003 deaths
20th-century American male writers
20th-century American screenwriters
American male child actors